The following outline is provided as an overview of and guide to forestry:

Forestry – science and craft of creating, managing, using, conserving, and repairing forests and associated resources to meet desired goals, needs, and values for human and environment benefits. Forestry is practiced in plantations and natural stands.  Forestry accommodates a broad range of concerns, through what is known as multiple-use management, striving for sustainability in the provision of timber, fuel wood, wildlife habitat, natural water quality management, recreation, landscape and community protection, employment, aesthetically appealing landscapes, biodiversity management, watershed management, erosion control, and preserving forests as 'sinks' for atmospheric carbon dioxide.

Focus of forestry 
 Tree – organism, whose species, age, vitality, growth, health, and size, are considered individually or more often, as part of a whole;
 Forest – defined as either a geographic area or delineated by the general composition of individuals;
 Biome – ecologically defined by its forest structure, leaf types, tree spacing, and climate

Branches of forestry 
 Agroforestry – integration of forests into agricultural systems in order to optimize the production and positive effects within the system and minimize negative side effects of farming
 Boreal forestry – analyzes the particular challenges of forestry in the world's boreal regions
 Close to nature forestry – theory and practice that takes the forest as an ecosystem and manages it as such. It is based on reduced human intervention, that should be directed to accelerate the processes that nature would do by itself more slowly.
 Dendrology – involves the study and identification of economically useful tree species
 Energy forestry – includes specifically managing for the production of energy from biomass or biofuel derived from a fast-growing species of tree or woody shrub
 Forest ecology – studies the patterns and processes of a forest ecosystem
 Forest economics – studies the impact of economics on forest management decisions
 Forest hydrology – embodies the effects of changes in forest land use on the movement, distribution, and quality of water in the ecosystem
 Forest mensuration – incorporates quantitative measurements of the forest stand to determine stand timber volume and productivity/health, and provides a basis off which management decisions can be made
 Forest pathology – research of both biotic and abiotic maladies affecting the health of the forest or tree, primarily fungal pathogens and their insect vectors
 Silviculture – is the art and science of controlling the establishment, growth, composition, health, and quality of forests to meet specific objectives
 Social forestry – addresses human-forest interactions, and the importance of community-based natural resource management
 Sustainable forestry – emphasizes forest management for long-term environmental, social, and economic sustainability
 Tropical forestry – is particularly concerned with management and conservation of forests in the tropics
 Urban forestry – entails the care and management of urban tree populations for the purpose of improving the urban environment
 World forestry – examines forest conservation at a global level

Forest management 
Forest management – comprises the overall administrative, economic, legal, and social aspects of forest regulation
 Analog forestry – a management focus that seeks to establish a tree-dominated ecosystem that is similar in architectural structure and ecological function to the naturally occurring climax and sub-climax vegetation community
 Bamboo cultivation – farming and harvesting bamboo for commercial purposes such as construction.
 Community forestry – combination of  forest conservation with rural development and poverty reduction objectives, accomplished through instating a legal framework that favors profitable and sustainable forest management
 Ecoforestry – emphasizes practices which strive to protect and restore ecosystems
 Hardwood timber production – process of managing stands of deciduous trees to maximize woody output
 Tree breeding – method of genetically modifying/selecting forest stock for improved growth or vigor characteristics
 Mycoforestry – ecological forest management system implemented to enhance forest ecosystems and plant communities through the introduction of mycorrhizal and saprotrophic fungi
 Permaforestry – approach to the wildcrafting and harvesting of the forest biomass that uses cultivation to improve the natural harmonious systems. It is a relationship of interdependence between humans and the natural systems in which the amount of biomass available from the forest increases with the health of its natural systems.
 Plantation forestry – industrial plantations are established to produce a high volume of wood in a short period of time. Some plantations are managed by state forestry authorities (for example, the Forestry Commission in Britain) and others by paper and wood companies (such as Weyerhaeuser, Rayonier and Plum Creek Timber in the United States, Asia Pulp & Paper in Indonesia).
 Short rotation forestry – managing a forest that utilizes fast-growing species as a bio-based energy crop for use in power stations, alone or in combination with other fuels such as coal
 Short rotation coppice (SRC) – focus on species that are able to naturally regenerate through stump sprouts to maximize economic productivity
 Sustainable forest management – emphasizes practices that maintain forest biodiversity, productivity, regeneration capacity, and vitality, while continuing to fulfill relevant ecological, economic and social functions
 Tree farm – a forest or woodland owned privately where timber crop production is a major management goal

Types of trees and forests 
 Types of trees
 List of trees and shrubs by taxonomic family
 List of tree species by shade tolerance – tree grouped by shade tolerance, a determinant in successional status
 List of woods – commonly used in the timber and lumber trade
 Types of forests
 By ecological factors (climate, composition, etc.)
 Boreal forests (taiga) – occupy the subarctic zone and are generally evergreen and coniferous
 Coniferous forests
 Temperate forests – forests in temperate zones
 Broadleaf forests, for example:
 Temperate broadleaf and mixed forests
 Evergreen coniferous forests, for example:
 Temperate coniferous forests
 Temperate rainforests
 Broadleaf evergreen forests – supported in warm temperate zones. Examples include:
 Laurel forests
 Tropical and subtropical forests
 Tropical and subtropical moist broadleaf forests
 Tropical and subtropical dry broadleaf forests
 Tropical and subtropical coniferous forests
 By physical structure or developmental stage
 Old growth forest
 Secondary forest
 By dominant tree species, for example
 Ponderosa pine forests
 Douglas-fir forests
 List of types of formally designated forests – various institutionally designated types of forest areas, generally classified by use or ownership

Geography of forests 

 List of countries by forest area – using data from the CIA's World Factbook, presents the total area in km2 and the percentage of land covered by forests
 Lists of forests
 List of old growth forests – by continent, country, province; with various descriptive information

Map of biomes

 List of life zones by region

Occupations in forestry 
 Arborist – professional responsible for the maintenance of individual trees in an urban forest  also called a tree surgeon.
 Donkey puncher was the operator of a small steam donkey, a machine used in logging in the 19th and 20th centuries.
 Fire lookout – person assigned to spot for fires/smoke atop a fire lookout tower
 Forest ecologist – studies patterns, processes, flora and fauna in forest ecosystems
 Forest economist – model and analyze economic aspects of forest growth, utilization, and conservation
 Forest engineer – civil engineer specializing in all aspects of timber and forest operations, including road-building, railways, log transport, etc.
 Forest ranger – responsible for managing and policing human use of the forest; sometimes also acts as educator and interpreter
 Forest sociologist – applied social scientist working with a wide variety of stakeholders interested in forests
 Forest technician – individual primarily responsible for the marking of timber sales and on-ground land management, often requires a two-year Associate of Science degree
 Forester – professional chiefly responsible for the management of forests, requires a Bachelor of Science degree in most countries
 Master forester – forestry expert responsible for forest management and training
 Hotshot crew/Handcrew – a group of wildland firefighters specialized in fire suppression tactics
 Lumberjack – the typical feller of trees and harvester of the lumber, duties can also include:
 Log bucking – delimbing and partitioning of trees into logs
 Log driving – transportation of logs on a river or lake downstream to the mill
 Log scaling – measurement of felled trees to determine the volume of wood going to the manufacturer
 Resin extractor – laborer who extracts resin from pine trees
 Rubber tapper – laborer who extracts natural rubber from tropical rubber trees
 Smokejumper – firefighters who parachute into remote areas to fight wildland fires
 Timber cruiser – responsible for assessing forest growth, health, and valuation
 Tree planters – help reestablish forests after logging, fires, and other events and circumstances

Silvicultural methods 

Silviculture – practice of controlling the establishment, growth, composition, health, and quality of forests to meet diverse needs and values. Silviculture also focuses on making sure that the treatment(s) of forest stands are used to preserve and to better their productivity.

Site preparation
 Controlled burn – use of fire in order to eliminate weeds, brush, or slash, or to release on-site seeds of fire-dependent species
 Stump harvesting – removal of tree stumps either for biomass or to free up space in the soil
 Drum chopping – knocking down small trees and brush to clear the ground for planting
Planting
 Broadcast seeding – scattering of seed either by hand or mechanically over a relatively large area
 Aerial seeding – dispersing of seed from an aircraft, used especially in mountainous areas
 Treeplanting – transplanting of juvenile seedlings into the ground at a predetermined spacing
Intermediate treatments
 Weeding – removal or reduction of herbaceous or woody species around seedlings
 Cleaning – removal of competing saplings of similar age in order to favor saplings of desirable growth characteristics
 Liberation cutting – removal of older and established overtopping trees from desirable saplings
 Thinning – removal of trees to favor the growth of select trees in order to maximize timber production
 Ecological thinning – removal of trees to favor the growth of select trees in order to favor the development of wildlife habitat
 Pruning – removal of the lateral branches on the trees in order to improve wood quality
 Pollarding – annual removal of lateral branches or main stem in order to encourage growth of branches to provide for firewood, or fruit production
Harvest rotations
Even-aged timber management
 Clearcutting – harvesting of all stems in a given area regardless of species and size
 Coppicing – cutting vigorous juvenile trees near the ground, regeneration comes from new shoots coming up from the stump
 Seed-tree – cutting of all trees save widely spaced residual trees, which will provide natural seedstock for the following generation and are later cut
 Uneven-aged timber management
 Selection – harvesting of selected trees in a stand, removing either merchantable timber or to favor the growth of desirable individuals (a thinning)
 Shelterwood – removal of merchantable trees in succession, establishing a multiaged stand
 Variable retention – removal of trees of varying density across a landscape, in order to retain structural diversity
Other
 Salvage logging – harvesting of trees killed by natural disturbances in order to maximize economic returns that would otherwise be lost
 Sanitation harvest – removal of individual trees affected by a pathogen in order to diminish the possibility the entire stand being affected
 Biomass harvest – harvesting of small wood for energy purposes, either following a commercial harvest or for its own sake, such as in energy forestry
 Underwater logging – harvesting of trees from underwater forests flooded during construction of artificial dams or reservoirs

Environmental issues pertaining to forests 
 Afforestation – the process of establishing a forest on previously unforested land, for reasons of timber harvesting, conservation of biodiversity, or soil decontamination, among many 
 Biodiversity conservation – examines forests broader role in supporting a variety of (socio)ecological systems
 Carbon sequestration – focus on forests' broader ecological functioning in consumption of carbon dioxide
 Conservation – focus on sustainability of forest resources and preservation of forest-based biodiversity
 Deforestation – the removal of trees in a forested area without sufficient regeneration, resulting in desertification in arid areas and loss of habitat and biodiversity
 Deforestation by region
 Ecological restoration – the role of trees in restoring degraded natural and built environments
 Flood control – addresses forests ecological role in natural regulation of rainfall
 Forest dieback – where trees on the periphery of a stand are killed by acid rain or parasites
 Forest fragmentation –  occurring when forests are cut down in a manner that leaves relatively small, isolated patches of forest, resulting in high amounts of edges and subsequent loss in wildlife habitat and biodiversity
 Forest transition – shift from a period of net forest area loss (deforestation) to a period of net forest area gain (afforestation) for a given region or country
 High grading – type of selective logging that removes the highest timber quality trees, resulting in poor genetic stock for subsequent generations
 Illegal logging – the unlawful harvest, transportation, purchase or sale of timber, contributing to deforestation, corruption, and destabilization of international markets

Forest resource assessment 
Forest inventory – systematic collection of data and forest information for assessment or analysis. An estimate of the value and possible uses of timber is an important part of the broader information required to sustain ecosystems.

Timber metrics 

 Diameter at breast height (DBH) – measurement of a tree's diameter standardized at 1.3 meters (about 4.5 feet) above the ground
 Basal area – defines the area of a given section of land that is occupied by the cross-section of tree trunks and stems at their base
 Tree taper – the degree to which a tree's stem or bole decreases in diameter as a function of height above ground
 Girard form class – an expression of tree taper calculated as the ratio of diameter inside the bark at 16 feet above ground to that outside the bark at DBH, primary expression of tree form used in the United States
 Quadratic mean diameter – diameter of the tree that coordinates to the stand's basal area
 Leaf Area Index – the ratio of total upper leaf surface of the forest canopy divided by the surface area of the land on which the vegetation grows
 Tools
 Biltmore stick – utilizes ocular trigonometry to quickly measure diameter and height 
 Diameter tape – cloth or metal tape that is wrapped around the bole, scaled to diameter
 Caliper – two prongs connected to a measuring tape are placed around the most average part of the bole to determine diameter
 Relascope – multiple-use tool that is able to find tree height, basal area, and tree diameter anywhere along the bole
 Clinometer – common tool used to measure changes in elevation and tree height
 Cruising rod – similar to a caliper, calculates the number of pieces of lumber yielded by a given piece of timber by measuring its diameter
 Hemispherical photography – estimates solar radiation and characterize plant canopy structure/density using photographs taken looking upward through an extreme wide-angle lens

Surveying techniques 
 Traversing – method of surveying used to establish sampling plots along a line or path of travel
 Chain – equivalent to 66 feet, widely used distance in surveying practices in the United States and other countries influenced by imperial Great Britain
 Line plot survey – plots taken at a regular predetermined distance along the traverse path
 Tools
 Pacing – quick method used to survey in the field, requiring calibration of one's "paces" (pair of footsteps) to a known distance (often a chain)
 Hand compass – a compact magnetic compass with a sighting device used to determine the location of plots for a given bearing
 Wedge prism – optical instrument typically made of glass ground at slight angles to refract light passing through it from the smaller width side of the prism to the thicker width side of the prism, calibrated to a desired plot size (basal area factor)
 Angle gauge – similar in principle to a wedge prism, although it must be held a fixed distance from the eye
 GPS – global satellite navigation systems used to determine the position of oneself and plots
 GIS – an information system capable of integrating, storing, analyzing, and displaying forest geographic information collected in the field

Timber volume determination 

 Site index – a species specific measure of site productivity and management options, reported as the height of dominant and co-dominant trees (site trees)in a stand at a base age such as 25, 50 and 100 years
 Stocking – a quantitative measure of the area occupied by trees relative to an optimum or desired level of density which varies according to management purpose even on the same site
 Stand Density Index – a measure of the stocking of a stand of trees based on the number of trees per unit area and DBH of the tree of average basal area
 Volume table – a chart based on volume equations that uses correlations between certain aspects of a tree to estimate the standing volume
 Stand density management diagram – model that uses current stand density to project future stand composition
 Units of measurement
 Cord – very common measure, equivalent to 128 cubic feet (3.62 m3), corresponding to a pile of wood, bark, and air 4 feet wide by 4 feet high and 8 feet long
 Stère – invented in France, equivalent to a cubic meter of cut wood with space for air
 Board foot – specialized unit of measure for lumber in North America, equivalent to the volume of a one foot length of a board one foot wide and one inch thick

Stand growth assessment 
 Increment borer – specialized tool used to extract a section of wood tissue from a living tree with relatively minor injury to the tree, used often for tree growth analysis
 Mean annual increment (MAI) – refers to the average growth per year a tree or stand of trees has exhibited at a specific age
 Periodic annual increment (PAI) – describes the average annual change in tree diameter between the beginning and ending of a growth period, used more often than MAI for percental growth
 Ecological yield -the amount of wood volume in any given year whose harvesting would be considered sustainable
 Growth and yield modelling – entails the creation of models of prospective tree growth and harvest yield for management purposes
 Economics
 Stumpage – the price charged by a land owner to loggers for the right to harvest standing timber on that land
 Optimal rotation age – the age at which the harvesting of stumpage will generate the maximum revenue or economic yield

Harvesting 

Logging – cutting, skidding, on-site processing, and loading of trees or logs onto trucks or skeleton cars.  The term is sometimes used in a narrow sense to mean moving wood from the stump to somewhere outside the forest, usually a sawmill or a lumber yard. However, in common usage, the term may be used to indicate a range of forestry or silviculture activities...

Harvesting methods

 Felling – process of cutting down a tree 
 Bucking – splitting of a felled and delimbed trees into logs
 Scaling – measurement of felled trees to determine the volume of merchantable wood
 Skidding – transportation of logs from the site of felling to the landing along the ground
 Forwarding – transportation of logs from the site of felling to the landing above the ground, usually to minimize soil disturbance but limits the size or amount of logs that can be moved at once
 Hauling – long-distance transportation of logs from the landing to their final destination, usually with a semi-truck but occasionally with a train 
 Woodchipping – grinding of logs into chips for engineered wood, mulch, paper, or fuel
 Cut-to-length logging (CTL) – an expensive but efficient system where trees are felled, delimbed, and bucked to scale directly at the felling site
 Cable logging – skidding using a wire cable attached to the felled trees, most common in areas with steep topographic relief, variations include
 High lead logging – a cable is anchored to a tree at the top of the hill:
 Skyline logging – a carriage is used alongside the main cable to provide leverage
 Shovel logging – transport of multiple logs close to the logging road using a stationary loader, often used to minimize soil disturbance
 Heli-logging – transport of logs from the forest to the landing via helicopter, most commonly used in inaccessible areas or to minimize impact on the soil
 Log driving – transportation of individual logs on a waterway to a mill or port downstream 
 Timber rafting – transportation downstream of multiple logs bundled together into a raft, considered less dangerous than log driving

Harvesting tools

Timber felling tools 

 Hand
 Axe – primitive tool used felling and splitting
 Chainsaw – portable mechanized all-purpose saw, the most common tool used in hand-felling 
 Crosscut saw – saws that have teeth that are designed to cut wood at a right angle to the direction of the wood grain, used for felling and bucking
 Bucksaw – a type of crosscut saw used by one or two people to buck felled trees into sawlogs
 Mechanized
 Feller buncher – vehicle with an attachment that can rapidly cut and gather several smaller trees before felling them
 Harvester – first half of the CTL system, vehicle that cuts, delimbs, and bucks the logs "to length"

Log transportation tools 
 Ground
 Peavey – a traditional tool consisting of a wooden lever handle with a movable metal hook with a sharp tip, used to spear the log for handling and moving
 Cant Hook – tool with the same premise as the peavey but with blunt teeth-bearing tip
 Yarder – in cable logging, a piece of equipment utilizing a pulley system of cables to pull or fly logs from the stump to the landing
 Forwarder – second half of the CTL system, the vehicle that carries logs clear off the ground from the felling site to the roadside landing
 Skidder – vehicle that drags logs along the ground from the felling site to the roadside landing
 Michigan logging wheels – historical skidder, consisting of a specially designed large set of wooden wagon wheels and could be used in unfrozen soil conditions
 Skid cone – a steel or plastic cone placed on the end of a log while being skidded, in order to ease its transportation or protect residual trees
 Water
 Splash dam – a dam built to temporarily raise the water level of a river to float timber downstream
 Flume – chutes specifically constructed to transport lumber and logs down mountainous terrain to a sawmill by using flowing water.
 Timber slide – chutes constructed parallel to a river in order to avoid damage to timber rafts caused by rapids or waterfalls
 Boom – barriers placed in a river, designed to collect and or contain floating logs felled from nearby forests

Forest products

Forest product – any material derived from a forest for direct consumption or commercial use, such as lumber, paper, or forage for livestock. Wood is by far the dominant forest product, used for fuel (as firewood or charcoal), structural materials in the construction of buildings, or as a raw material, such as wood pulp used in the production of paper. All non-wood products derived from forest resources are called non-timber forest products.

Primary forest products

 Lumber (also "timber") – structural material for the construction of buildings or furniture making
 Paper – made from wood pulp derived from the timber stock pulpwood
 Paperboard – a thick packaging material derived from paper, cardboard is the generic term
 Veneer – thin layers of high-quality wood, often decorative but also the primary product in plywood
 Multilaminar veneer – like veneer, but utilizes plantation wood in accordance with the principles of sustainable forest management
 Oriented strand board – mainly used in structural insulated panels, has largely replaced plywood
 Fiberboard – a cheaper and denser form of plywood, used when cost is considered most important. Often used as the underlying structure in car dashboards
 Drywall – a gypsum plaster placed inside two sheets of paper, used commonly as the finishing step in construction of interior walls and ceilings
 Wood-plastic composite – made from recycled materials, is crack- and split-resistant and used commonly outdoors

Secondary forest products

 Fuel 
 Firewood – the most unprocessed form of wood fuel, supplies the majority of the developing world's energy needs
 Pellets – a byproduct from sawmilling, is formed from compacted sawdust, easy to transport and has a high combustion efficiency 
 Cellulosic ethanol and Biomethanol – second generation biofuels that are a potential replacement for gasoline
 Charcoal – derived from tar, is used extensively in cooking, industry, and water purification, among others
 Black liquor – a byproduct from pulp production, can be gasified and used as a syngas
 Byproducts
 Cork – used to stop wine bottles and as the core in baseballs
 Tar – mainly used as a sealant for shingles and watercraft hulls
 Turpentine – derived from tar, historically used extensively to thin oil-based paints and a protective furniture wax
 Rubber – wide range of commercial and industrial uses, tires and tubes are the largest consumer uses
 Creosote – historically been used as a disinfectant, laxative, and to treat coughs
 Tall oil – a cheap alternative for use in soaps, lubricants, and drilling fluid
 Ecosystem services 
 Carbon sequestration – a technique for long-term storage of carbon to combat global warming
 Water purification – riparian forests act as biofilters to capture and biologically degrade pollutants
 Outdoor recreation – provides the natural infrastructure needed for ecotourism
 Land rehabilitation – the restoration of degraded land to its former state, largely accomplished through phytoremediation

History of forestry

History of forestry, by period

Ancient forestry 

 Primitive forest management
 Shifting cultivation
 Shifting cultivation under stress

 History of forestry in China
Forestry in the Zhou Dynasty (Chow) (1045–256 BCE)
Forestry in the Qin Dynasty (Chin) (221–206 BCE)
Forestry in the Han Dynasty (206 BCE – 220 A.D.)
Forestry in the Three Kingdoms (220–280 A.D.)
Forestry in the Jin Dynasty (266–420 A.D.)
Forestry in the Southern and Northern Dynasties (Sung) (420–589 A.D.)
Forestry in the Sui Dynasty (581–618 A.D.)
Forestry in the Tang Dynasty (618–907 A.D.)
Forestry in the Liao Dynasty (907–1125 A.D.)
Forestry in the Song Dynasty (960–1279 A.D.)
Forestry in the Yuan Dynasty (1271–1368 A.D.)
Forestry in the Ming Dynasty (1368–1644 A.D.)
Forestry in the Qing Dynasty (Ch'ing) (1644–1911)
Forestry in the Republic of China (1912–1949)

Early modern forestry 

 Pre-mechanical forestry
 Horse-drawn logging

 History of forestry in Europe
 History of forestry in Austria-Hungary
 History of forestry in France
 History of forestry in Germany
 History of forestry in Russia
 History of forestry in Sweden

 Naval forestry
 Naval stores industry

 Colonial forestry
 British timber trade
 History of American mahogany trade
 History of forestry in Burma
 History of forestry in India
 History of forestry on Java
 History of forestry in Mexico
 History of forestry in Trinidad and Tobago

Modern forestry 

 Forestry during World War I

 Forestry in the Alps
 Forestry in Brazil
 Deforestation in Brazil
 As a major environmental issue
 Forest governance in Brazil
 Selective logging in the Amazon rainforest
 Forestry in Chile
 Forestry in China
 Mechanized forestry
 Scientific forestry
 Selective forestry
 Controlled burn
 Heli-logging
 Reafforestation
 Plantation forestry
 Boreal forestry
 Tropical forestry

Contemporary forestry 

 Urban forestry
 Plant a million trees
 Environmental forestry
 Forest aesthetics
 Forest restoration
 Analog forestry
 Ecological forestry

History of forestry institutions

History of forestry law 

 History of forestry law

United States
 Forest Reserve Act of 1891
 Multiple Use – Sustained Yield Act of 1960 required multiple use of federal forest land
 Organic Act of 1897
 Right of Way Act of 1901 – an act relating to rights of way through certain parks, reservations, and other public lands (H.R. 11973)
 Transfer Act of 1905 – an act providing for the transfer of forest reserves from the Department of Interior to the Department of Agriculture (H.R. 8460, Public Resolution No. 34)
 American Antiquities Act of 1906
  Appropriations Act Forbidding Further National Forests ("An Act Making appropriations for the Department of Agriculture for the fiscal year ending June thirtieth, nineteen hundred and eight", 1907) – also forbidding renaming forest reserves to National Forests (H.R. 24815, Public Act No. 242:2)

Hong Kong
 Forests and Countryside Ordinance (1997)

India
 Indian Forest Act, 1927
 Forest Rights Act (India) – a historic law passed in 2006 protecting the rights of scheduled tribes and other forest dwellers

International
 International Tropical Timber Agreement, 1983
 International Tropical Timber Agreement, 1994

 Forest rights
 Right of Way Act of 1901, USA, relating to rights of way through certain parks, reservations, and other public lands. H.R. 11973
 Forest Rights Act (India)

History of forestry agencies 

 History of forestry agencies
 Canadian Forest Service (Canada)
 Indian Forest Service (India)
 Corpo Forestale dello Stato (Italy)
 Ministry of Agriculture, Forestry and Fisheries (Japan)
 Korea Forest Service (S. Korea)
 CONAFOR Comisión Nacional Forestal (Mexico)
 New Zealand Forest Service (NZ)
 Department of Forest Conservation (Sri Lanka)
 Forestry Commission (United Kingdom)
 United States Forest Service, History of the United States Forest Service (USA)

History of forestry organizations 

History of forestry organizations
 History of the European Forest Institute
 History of the Food and Agriculture Organization
 History of the Forest History Society
 History of the Forest Stewardship Council
 History of the International Tropical Timber Organization
 History of the International Union of Forest Research Organizations
 History of the Royal Forestry Society of England, Wales, and Northern Ireland
 History of the Society of American Foresters

Historic schools of forestry 

List of historic schools of forestry
 Biltmore Forest School, near Asheville, North Carolina – the first school of forestry in North America
 French National School of Forestry, Nancy, est. 1824
 History of the Imperial Forestry Institute at Oxford
 History of the New York State College of Forestry – the first four-year college of forestry in North America
 History of the Pennsylvania Forestry Academy
 Imperial Forestry School, Dehadrun, India
 Mining and Forestry Academy, Schemnitz, Austria-Hungary
 Royal Saxon Academy of Forestry
 Saint Petersburg Forestry Institute

History of forestry as a profession 

 History of forestry as a profession

History of forestry research 

 History of forestry research
 Forest Research Institute Malaysia
 Forest Products Laboratory USA

History of forestry conferences 

 History of forestry conferences
 First International Forestry Exhibition, Edinburgh, Scotland, 1884
 World Forestry Congress – the largest and most significant gathering of the world forestry sector, held since 1926 under the auspices of the FAO
 IUFRO World Congress

History of forestry science and technology 

History of silviculture
History of forestry technology
 History of the chainsaw
 History of the crosscut saw
 History of the mechanization of forestry
 Use of remote sensing in forestry
 Use of computer modeling in forestry

Forestry education
 Forest research institutes – formal forest (or forestry) research institutes around the world
 Forestry technical schools – specializing in technical or practical training in forestry
 Forestry universities and colleges – institutions worldwide providing graduate and/or undergraduate education leading to a degree in forestry
 Historic schools of forestry – schools of forestry throughout history

Forestry organizations 
 Confederation of Forest Industries

Governmental forestry agencies 
 List of forestry ministries – government forestry agencies, by country

International forestry organizations 

 ASEAN-ROK Forest Cooperation
 Avoided Deforestation Partners
 Center for International Forestry Research
 Coalition for Rainforest Nations
 Collaborative Partnership on Forests
 Commonwealth Forestry Association
 Community Forestry International
 Congo Basin Forest Partnership
 Conservation International
 European Arboricultural Council
 FERN
 Forest Peoples Programme
 Forest Stewardship Council
 The Forest Trust
 Forestry Information Centre
 Forests Monitor
 Foundation for Environmental Education
 Global Forest Coalition
 Global Forest Information Service
 Global Forest Information System
 International Analog Forestry Network
 International Association of Students in Agricultural and Related Sciences
 International Forestry Students' Association
 International Society of Arboriculture
 International Tropical Timber Organization
 International Union for Conservation of Nature
 International Union of Forest Research Organizations
 NICOL Forests UK
 Plant A Tree Today Foundation
 Programme for the Endorsement of Forest Certification
 Rainforest Action Network
 Rainforest Alliance
 Rainforest Foundation Fund
 RECOFTC – The Center for People and Forests
 Resource Extraction Monitoring
 Roundtable on Sustainable Palm Oil
 Sustainable Forestry Initiative
 Taiga Rescue Network
 Tropenbos International
 United Nations REDD Programme
 United Nations Forum on Forests
 World Rainforest Movement

Forestry publications 

 List of forestry journals – academic journals in forestry and related fields

Notable people 

 John Evelyn (1620–1706) – known for his knowledge of trees, and his treatise Sylva, or A Discourse of Forest-Trees and the Propagation of Timber (1664)
 Heinrich Cotta (1763–1844) – German silviculturist and pioneer of modern scientific forestry, founder of the Royal Saxon Academy of Forestry
 Georg Ludwig Hartig (1764–1837) – prominent forest manager, author, and founder of one of the first dedicated schools of forestry in Europe; affiliated in his later years with the University of Berlin
 Alfonse Romanovich Vargas de Bedemar (1816–1902) – "one of the founders of the Russian school of forest mensuration"
 Franklin B. Hough, MD (1822–1885) – chief of the United States Division of Forestry, the "father of American forestry"
 Sir Dietrich Brandis (1824–1907) – considered the "father of tropical forestry"
 Sir William Schlich (1840–1925) – founder of Oxford University's forestry program
 Bernhard Fernow (1851–1923) – laid the groundwork for the United States Forest Service, founding dean of the first professional forestry school in the United States
 Gifford Pinchot (1865–1946) – first chief of the United States Forest Service and proponent of the Wise Use Movement
 Carl A. Schenck (1868–1955) – responsible for incorporating German scientific management techniques into American forest management, and founder of Biltmore Forest School, the first forestry school in the United States
 Károly Bund (1869–1931) – early academic and practical forester whose work in the Hungarian National Forestry Association increased treeplanting and intensified efforts to protect natural forests, indigenous tree species, and forestry workers in Austria-Hungary
 Robert Scott Troup (1874–1939) – founder of Oxford's Imperial Forestry Institute
 Theodore Salisbury Woolsey, Jr. (1880–1933) – used scientific forestry to help France address timber shortages during World War I
 Aldo Leopold (1887–1948) – cofounder of The Wilderness Society along with Robert Marshall (below), prominent naturalist writer and environmental ethicist
 Kenneth Dupee Swan (1887–1970) – notable photographer for the USDA Forest Service
 Walter Bitterlich (1908–2008) – world-renowned Austrian scientist, best known for the invention of variable plot sampling
 Jack C. Westoby (1913–1988) – Chief Forester, United Nations Food and Agriculture Organization, "father of world forestry"
 Sakari Pinomäki (1933–2011) – pioneer of mechanized forest harvesting vehicles, decreasing the time required for harvesting and risk to loggers
 Stephen C. Sillett (1968–) – revolutionized the approach and methodology of studying plant and animal life in old growth canopies of large trees

Allied fields 

 Botany – study of plant life and development that explains the biological basis of trees, such as structure, growth, reproduction, metabolism, response to disease, and chemical properties
 Conservation biology – conscientious management of forests can preserve or enhance biodiversity of dependent species
 Dendrochronology – method of scientific dating based on the analyses of tree-ring growth patterns, analysis of long-lived individual trees can provide insight into climatic conditions of the past
 Ecology – whose principles are the main scientific basis of forestry 
 Ecophysiology – study of an organism's physiology to environmental conditions that explains the success of a particular tree species' growth, reproduction, survival, and abundance
 Forest history – documents natural and human history of forests and forest use
 Natural resource management – brings together planning, management, conservation and sustainability of human use of natural resources, including forests
 Rural sociology – studies human perceptions, interactions and use of forests and associated resources
 Soil science – physical, chemical, and biological properties of soil greatly determines the success of tree species and individuals

See also 

 Outline of ecology

References

External links 

State of the World's Forests (SOFO) – a report issued by the Food and Agriculture Organization of the United Nations on forest and forestry trends worldwide, last published in 2009
Forestry Images
International Society for Tropical Foresters
The Forestry Commission
The Forestry Guild
Sylva Foundation
 International Wood Collectors Society
 Xiloteca Manuel Soler (One of the largest private collection of wood samples)
Rainforest Alliance
UNU Open Educational Resource on Forestry, Forest Economics and Forest Policy

 

 
Forestry
Forestry